Coughing Up a Storm is the first album by the Australian punk band Frenzal Rhomb, released in 1995. It was re-titled Once a Jolly Swagman Always a Jolly Swagman for its 1997 U.S. release.

Track listing (original Australian version)

The last of these hidden tracks has messages from a Frenzal answering machine tape, including several (sometimes abusive) messages from the former drummer Karl.

Track listing ('Swagman' version) 

The published LP track listing does not mention the track "Infotainment", which is hidden between "Sick and Tired" and "Dugadugabowbow".

Tracks 01-07 are taken from the Dick Sandwich EP.
Tracks 08-21 are taken from the Coughing Up a Storm album.
Tracks 22-24 are taken from the Sorry About the Ruse EP.

1995 debut albums
Frenzal Rhomb albums